Germaine Aussey (born Germaine Adrienne Agassiz, December 18, 1909 in Paris – March 15, 1979 in Geneva) was a French actress who worked with, among others, René Clair, Julien Duvivier, Paul Fejos, Jean Grémillon, Marc Allégret, and Sacha Guitry. She was, from 1940-1945, married to circus impresario John Ringling North. The union ended in divorce.

Selected filmography
 The Train of Suicides (1931)
 Here's Berlin (1932)
 Bach the Millionaire (1933)
 The Concierge's Daughters (1934)
 Speak to Me of Love (1935)
 Princesse Tam-Tam (1935)
 Beloved Imposter (1936)
 The Brighton Twins (1936)
 Adventure in Paris (1936)
 Parisian Life (1936)
 The Pearls of the Crown (1937)
 Beyond Love (1940)
 Idyll in Budapest (1941)

References

Actresses from Paris
French film actresses
1909 births
1979 deaths
20th-century French actresses